The 1350s in music involved some significant events.

Events 
1353 – Ibn Battuta visits the Mali Empire and writes an account of his journey that includes descriptions of the music he heard there, and of several instruments including the ngoni and balafon (a type of xylophone).

Compositions 
 1356 – Following the Battle of Crécy, Guillaume de Machaut composes his Lai 24, lamenting the capture by Edward, the Black Prince of King Jean II and his son Philippe.

Births

Deaths

References

 
14th century in music